Walk Your Way Out is a 2017 stand-up comedy film written by and starring the American comedian Bill Burr.

Release 
The film was released January 31, 2017 exclusively on Netflix.

References

Footnotes

Further reading
Bill Burr’s Standup Special ‘Walk Your Way Out’ Premieres on Netflix January 31st. Vulture.com. JAN. 18, 2017
Bill Burr: Walk Your Way Out. Medium. Feb 9, 2017.

2017 films
2017 comedy films
Netflix specials
2010s English-language films
Films directed by Jay Karas